Big Brother 2008 might refer to:
 Big Brother Australia 2008, the eighth season of the Australian reality television series Big Brother Australia (2001-2008)
 Big Brother Brasil 8, the seventh season of the Brazilian reality television series Big Brother Brazil (2002-)
 Big Brother 4 (Bulgaria), the fourth season of the Bulgarian reality series Big Brother Bulgaria (2004-)
 Big Brother Germany 8, the seventh season of the German reality television series Big Brother Germany (2000-)
 Big Boss 2, the first season of the Indian reality television series Big Boss (2007-)
 Grande Fratello 8, the eighth season of the Italian reality television series Grande Fratello (2000-)
 VIP Veliki brat 2, the second season of the Serbian, Montenegrin, and Bosnia-Herzegovinian reality television series Veliki brat (2006-)
 Big Brother (Slovenia), the second season of the Slovenian reality television series Big Brother Slovenia (2007-)
 Pinoy Big Brother: Teen Edition Plus, the second Teen season of Filipino reality television series Pinoy Big Brother (2005-)
 Big Brother: Celebrity Hijack, the first series of the UK reality television show Big Brother UK
 Big Brother 2008 (UK), the ninth non-celebrity series of the UK reality television show Big Brother UK (2000-)
 Big Brother 9 (U.S.), the ninth season of US reality television series Big Brother US (2000-)
 Big Brother 10 (U.S.), the tenth season of US reality television series Big Brother US (2000-)
 Big Brother Suomi 2008, the fourth season of Finland reality television series. Big Brother Suomi (2005–)